The Hourglass Sanatorium  is a 1973 Polish surrealist film directed by Wojciech Jerzy Has, starring Jan Nowicki, Tadeusz Kondrat, Mieczysław Voit, Halina Kowalska and Gustaw Holoubek. It is also known as The Sandglass in English-speaking countries. The story follows a young Jewish man who visits his father in a mystical sanatorium where time does not behave normally. The film is an adaptation of Bruno Schulz's story collection Sanatorium Under the Sign of the Hourglass. It won the Jury Prize at the 1973 Cannes Film Festival.

Plot
Joseph (Jan Nowicki) travels through a dream-like world, taking a dilapidated train to visit his dying father, Jacob, in a sanatorium. When he arrives at the hospital, he finds the entire facility is going to ruin and no one seems to be in charge or even caring for the patients. Time appears to behave in unpredictable ways, reanimating the past in an elaborate artificial caprice.

Though Joseph is always shown as an adult, his behavior and the people around often depict him as a child. He befriends Rudolf, a young boy who owns a postage stamp album. The names of the stamps trigger a wealth of association and adventure in Joseph. Among the many occurrences in this visually potent phantasmagoria include Joseph re-entering childhood episodes with his wildly eccentric father (who lives with birds in an attic), being arrested by a mysterious unit of soldiers for having a dream that was severely criticized in high places, reflecting on a girl he fantasized about in his boyhood and commandeering a group of historic wax mannequins. Throughout his strange journey, an ominous blind train conductor reappears like a death figure.

Has also adds a series of reflections on the Holocaust that were not present in the original texts, reading Schulz's prose through the prism of the author's death during World War II and the demise of the world he described.

Cast

Production
The Hourglass Sanatorium is not solely an adaptation of Sanatorium Under the Sign of the Hourglass, but also includes sequences from other works by Bruno Schulz. Regarding the possibility of a film adaptation of a book written by Schulz, director Wojciech Jerzy Has said: "Schulz's poetic prose was the reading of my early youth. It influenced my films. That is why the realization of The Hourglass Sanatorium was a must for me. My aim was not to make a literal adaption of the work, but rather to do justice to what we call the work's poetics: its unique, isolated world, its atmospherics, colours and shapes." The time period of the film is a mixture of elements from the turn-of-the-century Galicia where Schulz grew up, and Has' own pre-World War II memories of the same region. The film was produced by Zespół Filmowy Silesia. Principal photography took place at the Wytwórnia Filmów Fabularnych studios in Łódź.

Release

Despite being a major production, the finished film was met by reluctance from the Polish authorities. Not only was the crumbled sanatorium interpreted as a parallel to the poor condition of many institutions and manor houses in contemporary Poland; Has had also chosen to emphasize the Jewish aspects of the source material, and this soon after an antisemitic campaign the government had launched in 1968, which had prompted around 30,000 Polish Jews to leave the country. The authorities forbid Has to submit The Hourglass Sanatorium for the 1973 Cannes Film Festival, but the director managed to smuggle a print abroad so the film could be screened at the festival. The Cannes jury, led by actress Ingrid Bergman, honoured the film with the Jury Prize. The Polish premiere took place on December 11, 1973. The film is among 21 digitally restored classic Polish films chosen for Martin Scorsese Presents: Masterpieces of Polish Cinema.  and has been released on blu-ray in a related box set by Milestone Cinema.

Reception
When The Hourglass Sanatorium was released in Poland it met with mixed reviews from the critics and it was mostly criticized by literary scholars. Artur Sandauer noted that the book was a great material for a film, however, he strongly rejected Has's adaptation since in his opinion it changed Schulz's story "of cosmic dimensions" into "grotesque folklore". Jerzy Jastrzębski opined that Has's film evokes "a feeling of clear insufficiency". The film was positively reviewed by Konrad Eberhard and Adam Garbicz who claimed that it wasn't the film director's intention to adapt Schulz's prose in a literal manner but rather to capture its eschatological climate.

In France, the film was very positively received with film critics such as François Mourin, writing for L'Humanité, praising it for the costumes, set design and decorations, cinematography as well as the actors' performance. Jacques Siclier writing for Le Monde stated that the viewer watching the film experiences "an emotional and breathtaking shock". Richard Bégin described the film's "permeable atmosphere of transcience and deadness" generated by the dominant shots of ruins.

The film also received recognition in Britain and the United States. Phelim O’Neill of The Guardian considered Has's film as "another psychedelic classic" while Michael Wilmington of Chicago Tribune gave the film 3.5 stars out of 4 commenting on the splendid and surreal adaptation of Schulz's literary work.

In the 2015 poll conducted by Polish Museum of Cinematography in Łódź, The Hourglass Sanatorium was ranked as the fifth greatest Polish film of all time.

See also
 Cinema of Poland
 List of Polish language films

References
Essay on the film: A Journey into the Underworld

External links
 
 The Hourglass Sanatorium at Culture.pl

1973 films
1970s Polish-language films
Films directed by Wojciech Has
Films based on works by Bruno Schulz
Films based on Polish novels
Films based on short fiction
Films shot in Poland
Mannequins in films
Surrealist films
1970s science fiction drama films
Polish science fiction drama films
1973 drama films